The Order of Tomáš Garrigue Masaryk is an Order of the Czech Republic and the former Czechoslovakia. It was established in 1990 after the Velvet Revolution, and re-established in 1994 (following the dissolution of Czechoslovakia).  The President of the Czech Republic awards it to individuals who have made outstanding contributions to the development of democracy, humanity and human rights. Unlike in the past, it is awarded to the Czech citizens and foreigners alike. The order has five classes, of which class I is the highest.  The order is named in honor of Tomáš Garrigue Masaryk, an advocate of Czechoslovak independence and the first President of Czechoslovakia.

Design 
The insignia was designed by Vladimír Oppl. The badge  is a blue enameled star-shaped ornament with Masaryk's portrait  placed in the center.  A medallion placed centrally on the reverse of the badge bears the Greater Coat of Arms of the Czech Republic encircled by a white ring with the inscription "VERNI ZUSTANEME" ("We Shall Remain Faithful"), the motto of the Order.

Ribbon bars

Recipients

Czechoslovakia

1991

Cardinal Josef Beran, in memoriam, class I
Josef Čapek, Dr. h.c., in memoriam, class I
Prof. Dr. Václav Černý, CSc., in memoriam, class I
Rudolf Firkušný, class I
Prof. Dr. Milan Hodža, in memoriam, class I
JUDr. Milada Horáková, in memoriam, class I
JUDr. Janko Jesenský, in memoriam, class I
Ing. arch. Dušan Jurkovič, in memoriam, class I
Záviš Kalandra, in memoriam, class I
Rafael Kubelík, class I
Jan Masaryk, Dr.h.c., in memoriam, class I
Jan Palach, in memoriam, class I
Dr. Ján Papánek, class I
Prof. Jan Patočka, in memoriam, class I
Ferdinand Peroutka, in memoriam, class I
Prof. PhDr. Daniel Rapant, in memoriam, class I
Dr. Fedor Ruppeldt, in memoriam, class I
Jaroslav Seifert, in memoriam, class I
Ing. Rostislav Sochorec, in memoriam, class I
PhDr. Milan Šimečka, in memoriam, class I
Prof. Svätopluk Štúr, in memoriam, class I
Dominik Tatarka, in memoriam, class I
Cardinal František Tomášek, class I
Jan Zajíc, in memoriam, class I
Tomáš Baťa, class II 
JUDr. Prokop Drtina, in memoriam, class II
Rudolf Fraštacký, in memoriam, class II
Pavol Peter Gojdič, in memoriam, class II
Prof. Dr. Josef Grňa, in memoriam, class II
Egon Hostovský, in memoriam, class II
Roman Jakobson, in memoriam, class II
Jiří Kolář, class II
Dr. Jindřich Kolovrat, class II
MVDr. Martin Kvetko, class II
Reverend Dr. Jan Lang, class II
JUDr. Jozef Lettrich, in memoriam, class II
Bohuslav Martinů, in memoriam, class II
J.E. Dr. Anastáz Opasek, class II
Dr. Hubert Ripka, in memoriam, class II
Prof. František Schwarzenberg, class II
Koloman Sokol, class II
Prof. Dr. Jaroslav Stránský, in memoriam, class II
Msgr. Jan Šrámek, in memoriam, class II
Prof. Dr. Vavro J. Šrobár, in memoriam, class II
Jan Zahradníček, in memoriam, class II
Dr. Petr Zenkl, in memoriam, class II
ThDr. Josef Zvěřina, in memoriam, class II
JUDr. Samuel Belluš, class III
Dr. Johann Wolfgang Brügel, in memoriam, class III
Jan Čep, in memoriam, class III
Prof. Dr. Ivo Ducháček, in memoriam, class III
Prof. JUDr. Karel Engliš, in memoriam, class III
Prof. Jozef Felix, in memoriam, class III
Viktor Fischl (Avigdor Dagan), class III
PhDr. Bedřich Fučík, in memoriam, class III
ThDr. Alexandr Heidler, in memoriam, class III
Prof. Václav Hlavatý, in memoriam, class III
Vincent Hložník, class III
JUDr. Fedor Hodža, in memoriam, class III
Vladimír Holan, in memoriam, class III
Josef Hora, in memoriam, class III
Ota Hora, class III
Jindřich Chalupecký, in memoriam, class III
JUDr. Ján Jamnický, in memoriam, class III
Ing. Štefan Janšák, Dr.h.c., in memoriam, class III
Prof. PhDr. Zdeněk Kalista, in memoriam, class III
Prof. JUDr. Imrich Karvaš, in memoriam, class III
PhDr. Božena Komárková, class III
Dr. Ing. Ivan Krasko, in memoriam, class III
Leopold Lahola, in memoriam, class III
PhDr. František Lederer, in memoriam, class III
Cyprián Majerník, in memoriam, class III
Ivan Medek, class III
Václav Neumann, class III
JUDr. Jaroslav Pecháček, class III
Dr. Přemysl Pitter, in memoriam, class III
Prof. Karel Plicka, in memoriam, class III
Alfréd Radok, in memoriam, class III
Doc. PhDr. Milan Rúfus, CSc., class III
Ing. Josef Šafařík, Dr.h.c., class III
František Švantner, in memoriam, class III
Prof JUDr. Eduard Táborský, class III
Doc. Zdeněk Urbánek, class III
Jan Vladislav, class III
Jiří Weil, in memoriam, class III
Otto Wichterle, class III
Prof. JUDr. Rudolf Briška, CSc., in memoriam, class IV
Prof. RNDr. Oskár Ferianc, DrSc., in memoriam, class IV
Ctibor Filčík, in memoriam, class IV
Doc. PhDr. Alexander Hirner, CSc., in memoriam, class IV
Ján Jesenský, in memoriam, class IV 
Prof. MUDr. Jiří Král, DrSc., class IV
Anna Kvapilová, class IV
Prof. RNDr. Michal Lukniš, DrSc., in memoriam, class IV
Prof. PhDr. Ján Mikleš, CSc., class IV
Jarmila Novotná-Daubek, class IV
Dr. Gustáv Papp, class IV
Bernadeta Pánčiová, class IV
Prof. MUDr. RNDr. Bohumil Sekla, DrSc., in memoriam, class IV
Ester Šimerová, class IV
ThDr. Jan Šimsa, class IV
Jaroslav Werstadt, in memoriam, class IV
Dr. Ing. Peter Zaťko, in memoriam, class IV

1992
JUDr. Ivan Dérer, in memoriam, class I
PhDr. Alfred Fuchs, in memoriam, class I
Jozef Gregor-Tajovský, in memoriam, class I
Prof. PhDr. Kamil Krofta, in memoriam, class I
JUDr. Ivan Markovič, in memoriam, class I
JUDr. Štefan Osuský, in memoriam, class I
JUDr. Lev Sychrava, in memoriam, class I
JUDr. Přemysl Šámal, in memoriam, class I
Jaroslav Šimsa, in memoriam, class I
Fr. Josef Štemberka, in memoriam, class I
MUDr. Vladislav Vančura, in memoriam, class I
ThDr. Vladimír Pavol Čobrda, in memoriam, class II
Vojta Beneš, in memoriam, class II
Zdeněk Bořek-Dohalský, in memoriam, class II
Fedor Houdek, in memoriam, class II
Václav Majer, in memoriam, class II
Jozef Országh, in memoriam, class II
Prof. PhDr., ThDr. Samuel Štefan Osuský, in memoriam, class II
Antonín Pešl, in memoriam, class II
Prof. PhDr. Albert Pražák, in memoriam, class II
Vojtěch Preissig, in memoriam, class II
Prof. PhDr. Emanuel Rádl, in memoriam, class II
JUDr. Juraj Slávik, in memoriam, class II
Prof. PhDr. Anton Štefánek, in memoriam, class II
Prof. PhDr. Jan Uher, in memoriam, class II
Ján Ursíny, in memoriam, class II
Prof. PhDr. Růžena Vacková, in memoriam, class II
Ján Bečko, in memoriam, class III
JUDr. Ján Bulík, in memoriam, class III
Prof. ThDr. František Dvorník, in memoriam, class III
Julius Firt, in memoriam, class III
Ing. arch. Vladimír Grégr, in memoriam, class III
MUDr. Vlasta Kálalová-Di Lotti, in memoriam, class III
Prof. PhDr. František Kovárna, in memoriam, class III
MUDr. František Kriegl, in memoriam, class III
Prof. MUDr. Božena Kuklová-Štúrová, DrSc., in memoriam, class III
Ján Lichner, in memoriam, class III
ThDr. Antonín Mandl, in memoriam, class III
František Němec, in memoriam, class III
JUDr. Josef Palivec, in memoriam, class III
JUDr. Josef Patejdl, in memoriam, class III
Františka Plamínková, in memoriam, class III
Prof. Marie Provazníková, in memoriam, class III
Václav Talich, in memoriam, class III
ThDr. Štěpán Trochta, in memoriam, class III
Květoslava Viestová, in memoriam, class III
Františka Zemínová, in memoriam, class III
Stanislav Broj, in memoriam, class IV
Ludwig Czech, in memoriam, class IV
Prof. Josef Ludvík Fischer, in memoriam, class IV
PhDr. Želmíra Gašparíková, in memoriam, class IV
PhDr. Anna Gašparíková-Horáková, in memoriam, class IV
JUDr. Helena Koželuhová, in memoriam, class IV
PhDr. Karel Kučera, in memoriam, class IV
Zdeněk Němeček, in memoriam, class IV
Dr. Ing. Václav Paleček, in memoriam, class IV
Ing. arch. Bohumil Přikryl, in memoriam, class IV
JUDr. Ladislav Radimský, in memoriam, class IV
Bohuslav Reynek, in memoriam, class IV
Josef Rotnágl, in memoriam, class IV
Evald Schorm, in memoriam, class IV
PhDr. Jan Slavík, in memoriam, class IV
MUDr. Karel Steinbach, in memoriam, class IV
JUDr. Grigorij Žatkovič, in memoriam, class IV

Czech Republic

1995 

 PhDr. Karel Čapek, in memoriam, class I
 JUDr. Ladislav Feierabend, in memoriam, class I
 Mons. ThLic. Karel Otčenášek, class I
 JUDr. Ladislav Rašín, in memoriam, class I
 Pavel Tigrid, class I
 Charles A. Vanik, class I
 Prof. PhDr. René Wellek, class I
 Lord Braine of Wheatley, class II
 Dr. Karel Hrubý, class II
 František Langer, in memoriam, class II
 Karel Poláček, in memoriam, class II
 JUDr. Mojmír Povolný, class II
 Wolfgang Scheur, class II
 ThDr. Antonín A. Weber, in memoriam, class II
 JUDr. Vilém Brzorád, in memoriam, class III
 Doc. PhDr. Josef Fischer, in memoriam, class III
 Prof. PhDr. Ladislav Hejdánek, class III
 PhDr. Zdeněk Rotrekl, class III

1996 

 Jan Opletal, in memoriam, class I
 JUDr. Rudolf Kirchschläger, class I
 Juscelino Kubitschek de Oliveira, in memoriam, class I
 Blahoslav Hrubý, in memoriam, class II
 JUDr. Antonín Hřebík, in memoriam, class II
 Milena Jesenská, in memoriam, class II
 Prof. ThDr. h.c. Dominik Pecka, in memoriam, class II
 Max van der Stoel, class II
 JUDr. Jakub Čermín, class III
 Eugéne V. Faucher, class III
 JUDr. Viktor Fischl, class III 
 Ing. Slavomír Klaban, CSc., class III
 Prof. JUDr. PhDr. Radomír Luža, class III
 P. Anton Otte, class III
 ThDr. Bohumil Vít Tajovský, class III
 Ludvík Vaculík, class III
 Jiří G. Corn, in memoriam, class IV
 Antonín Remeš, in memoriam, class IV

1997 

 Gorazd, Orthodox Bishop of Bohemia and Moravia-Silesia, in memoriam, class I
 Olga Havlová, in memoriam, class I
 František Halas, in memoriam, class II
 Ing. Rudolf Battěk, class III
 Otta Bednářová, class III
 JUDr. Jaroslav Drábek, in memoriam, class III
 Prof. PhDr. Josef Fišera, class III
 Ing. Richard Glazar, class III
 Mons. ThDr. Oto Mádr, class III
 Prof. PhDr. Radim Palouš, CSc., class III
 Karel Pecka, in memoriam, class III
 Colonel (ret.) Luboš Hruška, class V
 Dagmar Skálová, class V

1998 

 Zbigniew Brzezinski, PhD., class I
 Jeanne J. Kirkpatrick, PhD., class I
 Henry A. Kissinger, PhD., class I
 Jaroslav Kvapil, in memoriam, class II
 Prof. Dr. Mikuláš Lobkowicz, class II
 PhDr. Václav Renč, in memoriam, class II
 Dr. Richard Belcredi, class III
 JUDr. Stanislav Drobný, class III
 Prof. Viktor M. Fic, class III
 Emil Filla, in memoriam, class III
 Mons. ThDr. Antonín Huvar, class III
 JUDr. Václav Hyvnar, class III
 Vlasta Chramostová, class III
 Rudolf Karel, in memoriam, class III
 Major General Jaroslav Kašpar-Pátý, in memoriam, class III
 JUDr. Jiří Kovtun, class III
 Prof. ThDr. Jan Milíč Lochman, class III
 Mons. Václav Malý, Auxiliary Bishop of Prague, class III
 doc. Jaroslav Opat, DrSc., class III
 PhDr. Vilém Prečan, class III
 Vladimír Sís, in memoriam, class III
 Prof. ThDr. Ing. Jakub S. Trojan, class III
 Emanuel Viktor Voska, in memoriam, class III
 Marie Dubinová, class IV
 Zdena Mašínová, in memoriam, class IV
 Prof. PhDr. Jaroslav Mezník Csc., class IV
 Dr. Jaromír Šavrda, in memoriam, class IV
 Prof. Dr. Tomáš Špidlík, class IV (21 Oct. 2003 Cardinal)
 Bedřich Utitz, class IV
 Nicholas Winton, class IV

1999 

 Josef Karel Matocha, PhDr. ThDr. archbishop of Olomouc, in memoriam, class I
 JUDr. Oldřich Černý, class III
 PhDr. Přemysl Janýr, in memoriam, class III

2000 

 Rudolf Jílovský, in memoriam, class II
 Ing. Josef Lux, in memoriam, class II
 Prof. Dr. Jiří Horák, class III
 Prof. PhDr. Milan Machovec, DrSc., class III
 JUDr. Ing. Jaroslav Musial, class IV
 Prof. Dr. Michael Novak, class III
 Prof. PhDr. Miloš Tomčík, DrSc., class IV
 Prof. Dr. Hans Dieter Zimmermann, class IV

2001 

 Prof. Robert Badinter, class I
 Ryszard Siwiec, in memoriam, class I
 Vojtěch Dundr, in memoriam, class II
 Prof. JUDr. Václav Chytil, in memoriam, class III
 Jindřich Vaško, in memoriam, class III
 Barbara Coudenhove-Kalergi, class IV
 Petr Adamus, class IV
 Mons. ThDr. PhDr. Karel Vrána, class IV
 P. František Lízna, SJ., class V

2002 

 Cardinal Miloslav Vlk, Archbishop of Prague and Metropolitan Bishop of Bohemia, class II
 Luboš Dobrovský, class III
 PhDr. Richard Feder, in memoriam, class III
 JUDr. Zdeněk Kessler, class III
 Jacques Rupnik, class III
 Karel Jan Schwarzenberg, class III
 Karol Efraim Sidon, Rabbi of Prague and Chief Rabbi of the Czech Republic, class III
 Mgr. Pavel Smetana, Moderator of the Evangelical Church of Czech Brethren, class III
 JUDr. Dagmar Burešová, class IV
 JUDr. Ladislav Lis, in memoriam, class IV

2003 

 Václav Havel, class I (conferred by the parliament)
 Mary Robinson, class I
 Willy Spühler, in memoriam, class I
 Elena Bonner, class II
 Sergey Adamovich Kovalyov, class II
 Luisa Abrahams, class III
 Miroslav Kusý, class III
 PhDr. Emil Ludvík, class III
 JUDr. Lubomír Voleník, in memoriam, class III
 Adam Michnik, class III
 JUDr. Antonín Sum, CSc., class III
 Mons. ThDr. Jaroslav Škarvada, class III
 Antje Vollmer, class III

2004 

 Colonel (ret.) Arnošt Kubík, class III
 Lieutenant General (ret.) Ing. Tomáš Sedláček, class III
 Colonel (ret.) Otokar Vinklář, class III
 Fra. Josef Zlámal, O. Melit. Prior, class III

2005 

 Brigadier General (ret.) MUDr. Josef Hercz, class I
 Major General (ret.) Stanislav Hlučka, class I
 P. Martin František Vích, class III

2006 

 MUDr. Naděžda Kavalírová, class I
 Brigadier General (ret.) Miroslav Štandera, class I
 Matylda Čiháková, class II
 Captain Václav Kojzar, in memoriam, class II
 Mgr. Michael Josef Pojezdný, class II
 Mons. Prof. ThDr. Karel Skalický, class IV

2007 

Vladimír Bystrov, class II
Jiří Formánek, class II
František Zahrádka, class III

2008 
Jakub Blacký, class II
Bohuslav Bubník, class II
Jan Graubner, class II
Josef Lesák, class II
Jaroslav Grosman, class III
František Wiendl, class III

2009 
 Anděla Dvořáková, class 
 Josefina Napravilová, class III
 František Šedivý, class II
 Josef Veselý, class III
 Pavel Žák, class IV

2014 
 Hana Hegerová, class I
 Miroslav Zikmund, class I

External links  
Orders and Decorations
Tomas Garrigue Masaryk Order on the site of the Prague Castle 

Civil awards and decorations of Czechoslovakia
Tomas Garrigue Masaryk
Awards established in 1990
1990 establishments in Czechoslovakia